Aalesunds blad (The Ålesund Gazette) was a newspaper published in Ålesund, Norway between 1871 and 1895. The newspaper was politically conservative. In its first years, the editorial board consisted of the merchant Frants Mathias Olsen and printer Klaus Emil Fjelde, assisted by the lawyers Peter Anton Devold and Hans Anton Staboe Schjølberg. Responsibility was eventually taken over by the telegraph director Edvard Endresen. 

In 1896, the paper changed its name to Søndmøre Folketidende.

References

Defunct newspapers published in Norway
Norwegian-language newspapers
Mass media in Møre og Romsdal
Ålesund
Publications established in 1871
Publications disestablished in 1895